Archie James Yates (born 22 February 2009) is a British child actor. He is known for playing Yorki in Jojo Rabbit (2019), for which he received a Critics' Choice Movie Award nomination.

Career
Yates made his acting debut in the 2019 film Jojo Rabbit, in which he plays Yorki, Jojo's best friend. On 10 December 2019, Yates, Ellie Kemper and Rob Delaney were announced as the cast for Home Sweet Home Alone - Disney's sixth installment in the Home Alone franchise, on its Disney+ streaming service. Yates was cast as main character Max Mercer. He also voiced the character Sprout in Wolfboy and the Everything Factory on Apple TV+.

Filmography

Film

Television

Award and nomination

References

External links
 

2009 births
Living people
21st-century English actors
Place of birth missing (living people)
21st-century English male actors
English film actors
English male child actors
Male actors from Kent